"I Don't Care" is a pop song written by David Frank, Steve Kipner and Pamela Sheyne. It was produced by Frank and Kipner for Angela Via's self-titled debut album (June 2000). The single appeared on September 19, 2000, in the United States market, which reached the Billboard Hot Singles Sales chart.

"I Don't Care" was aimed at fans of Britney Spears (after the success of her single "...Baby One More Time"), Christina Aguilera (her hit "Genie in a Bottle" was co-written by Frank, Kipner and Sheyne), and 'N Sync.

Track listing
CD single
 "I Don't Care"
 "A Good Time"
 "Picture Perfect" (music video)

Maxi-single
 "I Don't Care"
 The Stickmix
 Soul Solution Uptempo Radio Mix
 Soul Solution Mix Show Edit
 Soul Solution Extended Club Mix
 912 Dub
 Soul Solution Bonus Beats
 "Picture Perfect" (video)

Charts

Delta Goodrem version

Delta Goodrem released a cover version of "I Don't Care" as her debut single on November 12, 2001. It appeared on the ARIA Singles Chart, but was not included on her debut album, Innocent Eyes (March 2003). The Sydney Morning Heralds Guy Blackman described the track as "an anonymous slice of Britney-esque 'tween-pop'". Goodrem had been "discovered and nurtured" by Glenn Wheatley, and signed with Sony Music Australia. The track was recorded with Vince Pizzinga (Danielle Spencer) producing.

In August 2007 Goodrem explained to Andrew Denton on his show Enough Rope with Andrew Denton that the Britney image was foisted on her "when you start with a record company you don't really know what the whole process is. You don't know how the whole military operation before a song even gets to the radio and for people to even get to hear it". The single is very rare and has been spotted selling on eBay for $199.99. Despite seldom mentioned as Goodrem's debut single, it did feature during her 2005 Visualise Tour. It was also featured in the "Edge of Seventeen" medley, which was included as a B-side to her single "I Can't Break It to My Heart".

Music video
Goodrem's video for this song followed a simple theme. It showed an angsty Goodrem escaping from her parents' house to be with her rebellious boyfriend. The boyfriend takes Goodrem on a motorcycle ride into the forest, where he blindfolds her. When Goodrem takes her blindfold off, she is surrounded by a tree full of ribbons, a special surprise that was created by the boyfriend. The video is also intercut with scenes of Goodrem dancing in a Christmas-light-filled backdrop, and a scene where Goodrem is dancing in a wheat field.

Track listing

Chart performance

References

2001 singles
2000 debut singles
Delta Goodrem songs
Songs written by Steve Kipner
2000 songs
Songs written by Pam Sheyne
Atlantic Records singles
Epic Records singles
Songs written by David Frank (musician)